Moonlight And Noses is an American silent comedy film directed by Stan Laurel and starring Clyde Cook. This is the first film of Clyde Cook series produced by Hal Raoch. The film's title is a wordplay of Moonlight and Roses, a popular melody that had been named and republished in 1921.

Cast
Clyde Cook as a burglar.
Noah Young as a burglar.
Jimmie Finlayson as Professor Sniff.
Fay Wray as Miss Sniff, the Professor's Daughter.
Tyler Brooke as Ashley, the Daughter's Sweetheart.
Marjorie Whiteis
Helen Gilmore
William Gillespie
Jules Mendel

References

External links

1925 films
American black-and-white films
American silent short films
Films directed by Stan Laurel
1925 short films
Silent American comedy films
American comedy short films
1925 comedy films
1920s American films